The Socialist Party USA, officially the Socialist Party of the United States of America, is a socialist political party in the United States. The party was established in 1973 as one of the successors to the Socialist Party of America, which had broken up a year prior, resulting in another group called Social Democrats, USA (legal successor) and the Democratic Socialist Organizing Committee (split).

The party is officially committed to multi-tendency socialism. Along with its predecessor, the Socialist Party USA has received varying degrees of support. Differently from its more moderate rivals, it advocates for complete independence from the Democratic Party. Self-described as opposing all forms of oppression, specifically "capitalist and authoritarian statist systems," the party advocates the creation of "a radical democracy that places people's lives under their own control—a classless, feminist, socialist society free of racism, sexism, homophobia or transphobia," in which "the people own and control the means of production and distribution through democratically controlled public agencies, cooperatives, or other collective groups"; "full employment is realized for everyone who wants to work"; "workers have the right to form unions freely, and to strike and engage in other forms of job actions"; and "production of society is used for the benefit of all humanity, not for the private profit of a few."

Headquartered at the A. J. Muste Institute, the party's national office is located at 168 Canal Street in the Chinatown neighborhood of New York City. The party has chartered state organizations in Michigan and New Jersey, as well as several locals throughout the country.

In October 2019, the Socialist Party USA nominated Howie Hawkins for president in the 2020 presidential election. Hawkins also received the Green Party presidential nomination and ran for that of various state-level parties, such as the Liberty Union Party in Vermont, in a bid to unite the "non-sectarian independent Left" behind a single campaign. Hawkins received 0.3% of the vote.

History

Background 

In 1958, the Independent Socialist League led by Max Shachtman dissolved to join the Socialist Party of America, which was founded by Eugene V. Debs. Shachtman had written that Soviet communism was a new form of class society, bureaucratic collectivism, in which the ruling class exploited and oppressed the population and therefore he opposed the spread of communism. Shachtman also argued that democratic socialists should work with activists from labor unions and civil rights organizations to help build a social democratic "realignment" of the Democratic Party. Though he died on November 4, 1972, and had little involvement with the Socialist Party in the year proceeding his death, his followers, identified as "Shachmanites", exercised a tremendous amount of influence on the party.

In its 1972 convention, the Socialist Party changed its name to Social Democrats, USA by a vote of 73 to 34. The change of name was supported by the two Co-Chairmen, Bayard Rustin and Charles S. Zimmerman of the International Ladies' Garment Workers' Union (ILGWU); and by the First National Vice Chairman James S. Glaser—these three were re-elected by acclamation.

Renaming the party as SDUSA was meant to be "realistic". The New York Times observed that the Socialist Party had last sponsored Darlington Hoopes as its candidate for President in the 1956 election, who received only 2,121 votes, which were cast in only six states. Because the party no longer sponsored candidates in presidential elections, the name "party" had been "misleading"—"party" had hindered the recruiting of activists who participated in the Democratic Party, according to the majority report. The name "Socialist" was replaced by "Social Democrats" because many American associated the word "socialism" with Soviet communism. The party also wished to distinguish itself from two small Marxist parties.

The convention elected a national committee of 33 members, with 22 seats for the majority caucus, 8 seats for Harrington's coalition caucus, 2 for the Debs caucus, and one for the "independent" Samuel  H. Friedman, who also had opposed the name change. The convention voted on and adopted proposals for its program by a two-one vote, with the majority caucus winning every vote. On foreign policy, the program called for "firmness toward Communist aggression". However, during the Vietnam War, the program opposed "any efforts to bomb Hanoi into submission" and to work for a peace agreement that would protect Communist political cadres in South Vietnam from further military or police reprisals. Harrington's proposal for an immediate cease fire and an immediate withdrawal of U.S. forces was defeated. Harrington complained that after its previous convention, the Socialist Party had endorsed George McGovern with a statement of "constructive criticism" and had not mobilized enough support for McGovern.

After their defeat at the convention, members of two minority caucuses helped to found new socialist organizations. At most 200 members of the Coalition Caucus joined Michael Harrington in forming the Democratic Socialist Organizing Committee (DSOC), which later became the Democratic Socialists of America (DSA). At its start, DSOC had 840 members, of which 2 percent served on its national board in 1973 when SDUSA stated its membership at 1,800, according to a 1973 profile of Harrington. Second, many members of the Debs Caucus joined David McReynolds in reconstituting the Socialist Party USA also in 1973.

Founding 

The Debs Caucus formed the Union for Democratic Socialism and on May 30, 1973, incorporated the Socialist Party of the United States of America, usually simplified as the Socialist Party USA. Many activists from the local and state branches of the old Socialist Party, including the party's Wisconsin, California, Illinois, New York City, Philadelphia and Washington, D.C. organizations, participated in the reconstitution of the Socialist Party USA.

After its founding, the party promoted itself as the legitimate heir of the Socialist Party of America. Former Mayor of Milwaukee, Frank Zeidler, was elected the first national chairperson of the party. Zeidler also helped re-organizing the party structure during its early years. He was later nominated as the party's candidacy for the presidential office, with Zeidler believing the party would be able to collaborate with other socialist parties nationwide to spread the message of socialism.

Subsequent history 
Since 1976, a member of the party was elected to the city council of Iowa City and several members have won tens of thousands of votes in elections for statewide offices. In 1982, William Shakalis, running for State Senate from Cambridge, Mass. on the Socialist Party line, received 12.3% of the vote against an incumbent Democratic State Senator. In 1992, Socialist Iowa City Councilwoman Karen Kubby won her re-election with the highest vote in a contested election in the history of the Iowa City Council and was re-elected  until retiring from the Council in 2000. In 2000, Socialist Wendell Harris received 19% of the vote for Mayor of Milwaukee, Wisconsin in the primary.<ref>"Norquist, Watts Win Mayoral Primary Election in Milwaukee" St. Paul Pioneer Press February 16, 2000; p. 2B.</ref> In 2008, Socialist Jon Osborne pulled in 22% of the vote for Rhode Island's 34th District State Senate seat while listed on the ballot under the Socialist Party USA label. During the 2010 United States Senate elections, Dan La Botz of the Socialist Party of Ohio received 25,368 (0.68%) votes in Ohio.

In 2011, Socialist Matt Erard was elected to a three-year term on the city of Detroit's Downtown District Citizens' District Council. In 2012, Socialist Pat Noble unseated his incumbent opponent in winning election to the Red Bank Regional High School Board of Education, Socialist John Strinka received 9.8% of the vote while running with the party's ballot label for Indiana's 39th district State House seat and Socialist Troy Thompson received 27% of the vote for Mayor of Floodwood, Minnesota. Also in 2012, candidate Mary Alice Herbert received 13.1% of the vote for Vermont Secretary of State while running with the dual nomination of both the Socialist and Vermont Liberty Union parties.

In 2016 the party endorsed Jarrod Williams for U.S. Senate in Nevada (6,888 votes, 0.6%), Seth Baker for the Maine State Senate (3,712 votes, 16.7%) and Michael Anderson for the Michigan State House of Representatives (1,584 votes, 4.8%). Both Baker and Anderson ran as Green Party candidates.

In 2018 the Socialist Party of Michigan endorsed Matt Kuehnel for the Michigan State House of Representatives, a libertarian socialist who ran as a Libertarian Party candidate (999 votes, 3.3%). The party also endorsed Maia Dendinger for Maine State Senate (1,109 votes, 7.1%), David Elliot Pritt for the West Virginia House of Delegates (2,358 votes, 6%) and Andrew Saturn as Public Utility Commissioner in Thurston county, Washington (41,664 votes, 41.7%). Dendinger ran under the Socialist Party label, whereas Pritt ran as a Mountain Party candidate. Pat Noble was re-elected as member of the Red Bank Regional High School Board of Education without opposition.

In 2020, Socialist Jonny Meade received 5.14% of the vote for Washington's 22nd District State House seat. Adriana Cerrillo won her race for the Minneapolis Board of Education 4th district, first advancing from the primary with 38.1% of the vote and winning the general in a narrow race with 49.9%

The party won its third elected official when Samantha Pree-Stinson won a seat on the Minneapolis Board of Estimate and Taxation. Pat Noble was re-elected as member of the Red Bank Regional High School Board of Education without opposition.

 Membership 
According to the party's first chairman, Frank Zeidler, the party had around 500 members nationwide in 1975. The Socialist Party experienced substantial growth during the late 1970s and early to mid-1980s, expanding from only around 600 dues-paying members to around 1,700. In 2008, WMNF claimed that the party had around 3,000 paying members. However, a CommonDreams article suggested that the organization had only 1,000 members in 2010, with party members claiming it to be an increase in the number of members. In May 2011, an article from The New York Times stated that the party has "about 1,000 members nationally". In February 2012, an article from The Root stated that the party had a "membership around 1,500".

 Current elected members 
 Pat Noble, member of the Red Bank Regional High School Board of Education
 Adriana Cerrillo, member of the Minneapolis School Board for District 4
 Samantha Pree-Stinson, member of the Minneapolis Board of Estimate and Taxation

 Ideology 
 Political positions 

While some party members favor a more gradual approach to socialism, most others envision a more sweeping or revolutionary transformation of society from capitalist to socialist through the decisive victory of the working class in the class struggle. Some party members also advocate revolutionary nonviolence or pacifism while some consider armed struggle a possible necessity. The party's Statement of Principles rejects equating socialism with a "welfare state" and calls for democratic social revolution from below. The party is strongly committed to principles of socialist feminism and strives to further embody such commitment in its organizational structure. Its national constitution requires gender parity among its national Co-Chairs and Co-Vice Chairs, its National Committee members and alternates and seated members of its branch- and region-elected delegations to the party's biennial National Conventions. The Socialist Party also rejected the new healthcare reform law of 2010 approved by the Obama administration, with Socialist Party National Co-Chair Billy Wharton claiming it to be "a corporate restructuring of the health insurance industry created to protect the profit margins of private insurance companies".

During his campaign, 2008 Socialist Party candidate for President Brian Moore was very vocal against the idea that Barack Obama was a socialist of any kind. He further commented on the issue, saying it was "misleading of the Republicans" to spread that message. In a later statement about Obama's policies, Wharton called Obama's 2010 State of the Union Address a "public relations ploy" and concluded saying: "The time for slick public relations campaigns has ended—the time for building our grassroots movements is more urgent than ever. The Socialist Party USA stands ready to join in such a political revitalization".

 International affairs 
The Party's National Action Committee condemned the Israeli actions during the Gaza War. The party demands that the Federal government of the United States cease providing military aid to Israel as a precondition for peace. The party also sought to withdraw American troops from Afghanistan. During the 2008 presidential election, the Socialist Party continued to place a strong emphasis on its full-scale opposition to American wars abroad, with Brian Moore, the presidential candidate, claiming the war was destroying small communities throughout the country. He also criticized what he called "pressure on the local governments" by the Bush administration. The Socialist Party of Connecticut denounced Obama's troop surge in Afghanistan, claiming that the President wasted needed resources the country needed to get pulled out of the financial crisis. After denouncing him, the state affiliate organized a protest in front of the federal building in Hartford.

In April 2017, the party issued a statement opposing further United States intervention into the Syrian Civil War. Ten days later, the party issued a follow-up statement opposing both the Khan Shaykhun chemical attack and United States' subsequent missile strike. In May 2017, the party condemned the Manchester Arena bombing and stood "against any attempt to turn this tragedy into political capital to further right-wing agendas and target oppressed communities".

 Government 

Socialist Party candidates, such as New Jersey gubernatorial and senate candidate Greg Pason, have also emphasized immediate public service demands—these reforms include socializing the United States health care system, a steeply graduated income tax, universal rent control and the elimination of all educational debts and tuition fees. In 1997, Pason called auto insurance "a regressive tax against working people". Moore was also vocal of his support for public healthcare and socialized medicine. Moore believes that capitalism is a system based on both exploitation and selfishness, which operates to serve the interests of corporations and the ruling class at the expense of workers and the poor. During his presidential campaign, he claimed that the lack of available remedy to collapsing economic conditions stems from the capitalist system's foundation upon "greed" and advocated its replacement with a new system founded upon economic democracy through social ownership and workers' control of our reigning industrial and financial institutions.

 State and local parties 
, the Socialist Party had thirteen chartered locals and two chartered state parties. There are also local organizers active in Arkansas, Maryland, Minnesota, Mississippi, Texas, Utah, Virginia and Wyoming.

 State parties 
 Socialist Party of Michigan
 Socialist Party of New Jersey
 Socialist Party of WisconsinFormer state parties Socialist Party of California
 Socialist Party of Maine
 Socialist Party of Kansas

 Locals 
 Bay Area Socialists
 Los Angeles Socialist Party
 Socialist Party of Western Connecticut
 Socialist Party of Kalamazoo County
 Socialist Party of Southern New Hampshire
 Central New Jersey Socialist Party
 Northern New Jersey Socialist Party
 Capital District Socialist Party of New York
 Socialist Party of New York City
 Northern Piedmont Local
 Central Oregon Socialist Party
 Socialist Party of Coastal South Carolina
 Puget Sound Socialist Party

 Presidential tickets 

 See also 
 List of elected socialist mayors in the United States
 Brian Moore 2008 presidential campaign
 Stewart Alexander 2012 presidential campaign
 Mimi Soltysik 2016 presidential campaign
 Howie Hawkins 2020 presidential campaign

 Notes 

 References 
 
 
 
 
 (for Green Politics).

 Further reading 
 David A. Epstein, Left, Right, Out: The History of Third Parties in America. Arts and Letters Imperium Publications. 2008.
 Alan Feuer, "Inside Socialist Party Headquarters". The New York Times''. October 20, 2008.
 R. W. Tucker, "The Debs Caucus: A Party Within a Party". Madison, WI. Socialist Party of Wisconsin. December 1970.

External links 
 
 The Radical Pamphlet Collection at the Library of Congress contains materials from the Socialist Party of the United States of America.
 The Mapping American Social Movements project at the University of Washington has mapped votes, membership, newspapers, and elected officials, membership by state and more.

 
Political parties established in 1973
Socialist parties in the United States
Democratic socialism in the United States
Multi-tendency organizations in the United States
Political parties in the United States